Majtie Kolberg (born 5 December 1999) is a German middle distance runner specialising in the 800 metres.

Career
From Ahrweiler, Kolberg became German 800 metres U23 champion in 2021. She finished second when making the step up to the senior German Championships the following year, finishing behind sometime training partner Christina Hering. Kolberg placed also second indoors that year.

Competing at the 2022 World Athletics Championships held in Eugene, Oregon, she qualified from the heats to make the semi finals in the women's 800 metres.

At the 2023 European Indoor Championships in Istanbul, Kolberg ran a new personal best time of 2:01.94 in the event to reach the semi-finals.

Her personal bests for 800 metres are 1:59.24 outdoors (Ninove 2021) and 2:01.94 indoors (Istanbul 2023).

References

1999 births
Living people
German female middle-distance runners
World Athletics Championships athletes for Germany
20th-century German women
21st-century German women